Vanda limbata is a species of orchid native to Java, the Lesser Sunda Islands and the Philippines.

External links 

limbata